Frank Davis (1921 – April 17, 2006) is regarded as the man responsible for making Waterford United F.C. the major force they became in Irish football from 1966 until 1972, winning the league title four of the six seasons he was in charge.

As Chairman Davis was responsible for bringing Johnny Matthews and Jimmy McGeough to the club, paying £3,000 for McGeough to Derry City F.C. Davis also represented the club on the FAI. He played a major part in the success of Waterford FC during his years in charge and also was the man who brought Peter Thomas to Kilcohan Park.

Davis died in April 2006 after a short illness .

2006 deaths
1921 births